Rhythm of Fear is the third full-length studio album from American crossover thrash band, M.O.D. It was released in 1992 on Megaforce Records and follows 1989's Gross Misconduct. In 1994, the band subsequently released Devolution.

Line-up changes saw Billy Milano take up bass duties as well as vocals, and Dave Chavarri replacing Tim Mallare on drums after the latter's departure to New Jersey thrash band, Overkill. Tim McMurtrie rejoined the band after having appeared on the debut album, U.S.A. for M.O.D., in 1987.

Track listing
All songs written by M.O.D.

Credits
 Billy Milano – vocals, bass
 Tim McMurtrie – guitar
 Dave Chavarri – drums
 Mark Mays – additional guitar
 Recorded at Trax East Studios, South River, New Jersey, USA
 Produced, engineered, and mixed by Steve Evetts
 Additional production by Billy Milano
 Assistant engineered by Greg Gasparino and Eric Rachel

External links
MOD and SOD official fansite

1992 albums
M.O.D. albums
Albums produced by Steve Evetts
Megaforce Records albums